Deltrice Andrea Graham (born March 18, 1967) is a former American football offensive tackle who played for four teams in the National Football League.  He played college football at Appalachian State University.

1967 births
Living people
People from Groveland, Florida
Players of American football from Florida
American football offensive tackles
Appalachian State Mountaineers football players
Kansas City Chiefs players
Carolina Panthers players
Seattle Seahawks players
Oakland Raiders players